San Lorenzo is a town in the Loreto Region in northeastern Peru. It is the capital of both Datem del Marañón Province and Barranca District and it has a population of 6,034 (2006).

Populated places in the Loreto Region